The Eurasian Conformity mark (EAC) is a certification mark to indicate products that conform to all technical regulations of the Eurasian Customs Union. It means that the EAC-marked products meet all requirements of the corresponding technical regulations and have passed all conformity assessment procedures.

Before this marking came into use, the prevalent product marking was GOST R 50460-92: Mark of conformity for mandatory certification.

History
Originally, the conformity assessment of the products, which were brought on the market of the USSR or Russia for the first time, was defined by GOST and TR standards.

From July 1, 2010, the Customs Code of the Customs Union between Russia, Belarus and Kazakhstan entered into force. The new Customs Code should replace the existing national certification rules such as Russian GOST-R, TR or Kazakh GOST-K standards by the uniform technical regulations and technical guidelines of the Customs Union.

Products, which thus meet the requirements of the technical regulations of the Customs Union or the Eurasian Economic Union (EAEU) (consisting of Russia, Belarus, Armenia, Kazakhstan, Kyrgyzstan), are marked with the EAC mark. The uniform EAC marking of the customs union was defined by the board decision of the EAEU Commission No. 711 of July 15, 2011.

The term TR marking in conjunction with the conformity assurance with the technical regulations of the CU or EAEU is therefore incorrect. Since February 2010, the new list of products subject to certification and declaration has been valid for the GOST-regulated area. In accordance with Federal Law No. 385 of December 30, 2009 On amendments to the Federal Law on Technical Regulation, the original deadline for 2010 was lifted on the personal request of the former President of Russia, Dmitry Medvedev, and the following items were ordered:
 To simplify the procedure for the introduction or modification of the TR in Russia (Ministry of Industry and Trade)
 To permit the application of international or foreign standards and guidelines (official translation, expertise by the standard authority, registration in the state standard information depot)
 To develop additional technical regulations without time limit

Development and function of EAC marking 

The EAC marking has been created to ensure the product safety for the final consumer. The board decision of the Customs Union of June 18, 2010, the Customs Union Convention of November 18, 2010, and the board decision of the Customs Union of April 7, 2011 provide the legal framework for numerous products of safety and health requirements as minimum requirements, which must not be undercut. A product may only be put into circulation for the first time in the field of EAEU and must be put into operation for the first time if it complies with the essential requirements of all applicable technical regulations. Some of the methods provided for this purpose are:

EAC declaration
EAC certification
State registration

With the EAC marking, the manufacturer indicates the conformity of the product with the basic requirements according to the applicable technical regulations. The manufacturer of the product is responsible for this marking (a representative authorized in the EAEU is required for manufacturers outside the EAEU). To the extent that the manufacturer has not complied with his duty outside the EAEU, this obligation is transferred to the authorized representative in the EAEU, and ultimately on the importer into the EAEU.

Important features of EAC marking 

Products which are subject to one or more technical regulations because of their nature must be marked with the EAC marking before being placed on the market or put into service for the first time. All applicable technical regulations must be taken into account.
Manufacturers of a product are responsible for which technical regulations they must apply during production.
The product may only be placed on the market and put into service if it complies with the provisions of all technical regulations applicable at the present time, and it is provided that the conformity assessment has been carried out in accordance with all applicable technical regulations.
The manufacturer shall attach the EAC marking to the product.
If required, an authorized body must be involved in the conformity assessment.
In addition to the EAC marking, no other mark or seal of approval is permitted, which could call into question the statement of the "EAC".
The EAC marking confirms full compliance with the "Basic Safety Requirements", which are specified in the Technical Regulations.

Attachment of EAC marking 
The EAC marking shall be put onto the product or to the attached label in a visible, legible, distinctive and permanent manner by the manufacturer or his authorized representative in the EAEU. The size must be at least 5 mm; the proportions must be respected if the EAC marking is reduced or enlarged. If the nature of the product does not allow it, it shall be put onto the package (if any) and the accompanying documents.
The EAC marking may only be carried out when all the requirements of the technical regulations applicable to the corresponding product have been met this includes EAC Certified lighting products for use in hazardous areas.

Application area 
The EAC marking is the prerequisite for the initial placing on the market in all member-states of the Eurasian Economic Union. The EAEU includes Russia, Belarus, Armenia, Kazakhstan and Kyrgyzstan.

Technical regulations 
For the following product groups there are technical regulations of the CU or EAEU as basis for the EAC marking.

Technical regulations of Customs Union and Eurasian Economic Union
Source:

See also
CE marking
State quality mark of the USSR

References

External links
 Official website of the Eurasian Economic Union (English)
 Official website of the Eurasian Economic Commission (Russian)
  SERCONS - EAC/TRCU Accredited Certification Body in Russia

Certification marks
Symbols introduced in 2010